The Scorpions RFC is an invitation rugby team in East Africa that was established upon principles that have many parallels with the Barbarian F.C. in terms of values, playing style, selection policy and the lack of a home ground.  The team wears black shirts and white shorts and, like the original Barbarians and the French Barbarians, players wear socks of their choice provided that they have played for the team that the socks represent (the socks shown to the right are the original Harlequins socks which were also worn by Kenya Harlequins in the 1950s and 1960s).

Foundation
The club was founded in 1959 in Dodoma, central Tanganyika (now Tanzania) to function as an invitation touring side. The idea was first put forward by W.K.L. Ken Thomas who also became the club's first captain and chairman.  With marginal rainfall, rocky outcrops, thorny scrub and dry sandy soil, Dodoma is an ideal habitat for the scorpions after which the club is named, but a less suitable place to play rugby is hard to imagine. The touring element drifted almost immediately into obscurity and the club eventually became based in Kenya as rugby in Tanzania dwindled during the 1970s.

Aims and Principles
The over-riding principle behind the team is to play and foster the playing of rugby football of the best possible type and to insist upon the highest standards of discipline and behaviour, both on and off the field. In the modern day when winning is everything this sounds old-fashioned, even pompous, it does not mean the Scorpions do not like to win, or do not play to win, it purely means that if at no-side enjoyment has been had by all, players and spectators alike, then the Scorpions have been true to their principles.

The vast distances and primitive transport networks of Colonial East Africa made the playing of rugby difficult, particularly so in Tanganyika.  The intention behind the founding of the Scorpions was to allow players in Tanganyika to play high quality rugby that would otherwise be unavailable to them, thus membership (which is by invitation only), would be available to any player in Tanganyika. With time the net was thrown wider to include any player in East Africa (Kenya, Uganda and Tanzania). The Scorpions are able to introduce younger players to a higher level of rugby and to experiment by trying players in unusual positions, something that representative selectors are unable to attempt for fear of criticism.

The club has no club-house, they usually play their matches at the RFUEA Ground and, in order to stimulate interest in rugby to as wide an audience as possible, they never take a gate allowing spectators from all financial backgrounds to watch them play.

Match List
The Scorpions have built up a sporting tradition of exciting encounters with famous clubs on tour. The majority of these games have been lost but the Scorpions have endeavoured to live up to their principles and have scored notable victories over Anti-Assassins (1964) and London Wasps (1973) and also earned a draw with Blackheath F.C. in 1979.

Blackrock College RFC is a club originally formed by old-boys of Blackrock College, an institution founded by the Congregation of the Holy Ghost in 1860. In 1939, the same order set up St. Mary's School, Nairobi to be run under the same Spiritian ethos, an ethos that embraces the benefits of sport in general and rugby union in particular.  This has begun a long connection between the order and the East African rugby community; St. Mary's School hosts an annual schools rugby festival and (along with Lenana School, Rift Valley Academy and Strathmore School) it is one of the major producers of rugby players in Kenya. In addition, Blackrock College RFC toured East Africa in 1971 and the Fourth Tuskers played a return fixture during their tour of Ireland the next year.

When, in 1973, the Scorpions played the Old Georgian Club from Argentina, the former England captain Dick Greenwood was in Kenya on a coaching assignment for the RFU.  He was selected to play in the second row by Scorpions who lost by one point after a non-stop display of running attacking rugby that ranks among the most thrilling matches ever played on the RFUEA Ground.  Dick then travelled to Italy to become the Coach of Rugby Roma Olimpic (1973–1976) and, using the contacts that he had made in Kenya, an East African tour was arranged for the Italian club in 1976 during which they too played against the Scorpions.

Match details

Blackheath 1979

Members

Past Administrators

Past Captains

Notable players
 Dick Greenwood (former  captain)
 E. Ted Kabetu (first black player to be selected by Scorpions and to represent East Africa)

Other Players
P.E L'Estrange

References

African rugby union teams
Rugby union in East Africa
Multinational rugby union teams